Bradley Smith (born 28 November 1990) is a British occasional motorcycle racer who for 2022 is linked to RNF E-Racing in MotoE. He was injured shortly after a Le Mans start when he was the opening rider team for Moto Ain Yamaha, at an FIM Endurance World Championship event in April 2022. He missed the opening three rounds of the MotoE racing season, being declared unfit to race at the third round at Mugello on 29 May 2022.

Late in 2022, Smith was called-in to ride as a rookie in the World Supersport Championship class, to replace injured Leonardo Taccini. Smith finished 14th after a three-place penalty in the first race at Circuito San Juan Villicum (Argentina), but was taken out when Luca Bernadi crashed into the rear of his Ten Kate Yamaha R6 at turn one early in the second race.

Smith was previously contracted from 2019 to Aprilia Racing as a development/test/replacement rider in the MotoGP class of the World Championship.

Smith was also contracted as a development officer, "to assist with rider recruitment and development" in the inaugural eSkootr Championship race series planned for 2022. During 2021 he was expected to participate in a British GP2 event, part of a series run alongside the British Supersport championship, for a one-off ride at Snetterton but failed to arrive at the circuit, instead competing in moto cross event.

Smith is the only rider to have taken a podium in all four classes of Grand Prix motorcycle racing, with top-three finishes in the pre-Moto3 125 cc class, Moto2 class, MotoGP class and MotoE World Cup.

Smith had a long association with the French Tech3 team, riding for six seasons, two in Moto2 class and four in MotoGP using factory-supported Yamaha YZR-M1 machines. He won the Suzuka 8 Hours in 2015, with Yamaha teammates Katsuyuki Nakasuga and Pol Espargaró.

Career

Early career
Born in Oxford, Oxfordshire, Smith's father raced in Motocross, and the family owned an open practice track. Smith got his first motocross bike aged six.

Smith applied for selection to the Auto-Cycle Union (ACU) academy for young racers, but was never chosen. He spent a year in 2004 aged 13 competing in Aprilia Superteens competition, finishing fourth behind three ACU Academy riders. In January 2005 he was asked to compete for the year in the Spanish 125cc championship as part of the MOTO GP Academy, winning the last three races ending the year 2nd just one point behind the champion.

125cc World Championship
For 2006, he joined the Repsol Honda 125cc Grand Prix World Championship squad, managed by Alberto Puig finishing 19th overall and rookie of the year, with a best result of 8th place in Motegi.

Remaining with the team in 2007, he took a first podium with third place at Le Mans. Nine more top-10 finishes left him 10th overall.

Smith signed with the Polaris World Aprilia team for the 2008 season. He secured his first pole position at the opening round of the season at the Losail International Circuit in Qatar on 8 March, but suffered a technical problem while leading. A number of midseason injuries affected him, but he scored podium finishes at Jerez and Le Mans (after briefly leading the five-lap sprint required by a red flag for rain). He led at both Assen and Sachsenring, but finished off the podium in both. He ended the season sixth overall, with three poles and four podium finishes but no victory.
For the 2009 season, Smith signed for Jorge Martínez's Bancaja Aspar Team to continue to ride an Aprilia, alongside Julian Simon. The deal also included an option to race in 250s for the team in 2010.  Smith had almost signed for the team in 2008, before signing for Polarisworld.

Smith won his first ever Grand Prix with a dominant performance at Jerez in May 2009.  Smith's first Pole Position of the season came at Mugello in which he scored his second Grand Prix victory after a brilliant fight against Nicolás Terol and Julian Simon. This race put Smith in the lead of the Championship with 74.5 points, just 3.5 points ahead of Simon. However, Simon hit form and ultimately won the title. Smith finished second to his teammate in the last three races of the season, losing the lead on the final lap in two of them. He ultimately finished as series runner-up.

In August 2009, Smith stated his ambition to move up to the new Moto2 class with the Aspar team, but the team's two seats were given to Julian Simon and Mike Di Meglio instead. In November 2009, Smith agreed a deal to remain with the Aspar team in the 125cc class for 2010 alongside Nicolas Terol.

Smith was a favourite for the title in 2010, after finishing runner-up in 2009, however the year was dominated by Spanish trio Marc Márquez, Pol Espargaró and Nicolás Terol. Smith did however manage three pole positions and six podiums, including a win at the final round of the season in Valencia on the way to fourth place in championship standings.

Moto2 World Championship

Tech3 (2011–2012)

2011 
After the 2010 Portuguese Grand Prix, it was announced that Smith would be competing in Moto2 in 2011, racing for the Tech3 team, alongside one of the riders that had denied him a Moto2 move a year previous, Mike Di Meglio.

Smith started his debut campaign in the Moto2 class well with seventh in his first race before following it up with a fourth-place finish at the Spanish Grand Prix. Smith scored his first podium with a second-place finish in his home Grand Prix at Silverstone, and he followed it up with two third-place finishes at the next two rounds. Smith finished his début season in the class, in seventh place in the final championship standings.

2012 
Smith's 2012 season was full of consistent points-scoring finishes, scoring points in all bar two races, but without a podium. His best result was a fourth-place finish at the Italian Grand Prix, and he eventually finished the season in ninth place in the final championship standings.

Petronas Sprinta Racing (2019)

2019 
Smith replaced Khairul Idham Pawi at his home grand prix in Silverstone, as one of several replacement riders following the Malaysian's withdrawal from the season due to injury.

MotoGP World Championship

Monster Yamaha Tech3 (2013–2016)

2013 
Smith was promoted to the premier class aboard a Yamaha for Tech3, with teammate Cal Crutchlow. He concluded the season in 10th place, with 116 points, running consistently within the top ten riders in most races. His best result were a trio of sixth places obtained in the Catalan, German and Australian Grands Prix.

2014 

In 2014, Smith continued to race with Tech3, with teammate Pol Espargaró. He finished fifth in the second round of the championship, the Grand Prix of the Americas in Texas, achieving his best result at that time. Later in the season, Smith achieved his first podium in MotoGP at Phillip Island, finishing in third place; he took advantage of late-race crashes for Cal Crutchlow and Espargaró to move into the position. He also received a penalty point from Race Direction, after he was deemed to have overtaken another rider under yellow flags. He finished the season in 8th place.

2015 

Remaining with Tech3 for the  season, Smith finished each of the first twelve races in the top ten placings, with two fifth-place finishes being his best results. At the San Marino Grand Prix, Smith achieved his best MotoGP result with a second-place finish despite staying out on track on slick tyres as rain was falling – he fell as low as 21st in the race order before riding through the field. With 181 points, Smith achieved his (as of February 2020) career-best finish in the MotoGP class in 6th place, best of all non-factory riders.

2016 
In 2016 a difficult start to the season culminated in a mid-season injury in practice at the Czech round. Though he started the Czech race before a mechanical retirement, Smith subsequently missed the next 3 rounds due to the sustained injury, being replaced by superbike rider Alex Lowes. Smith was relegated to just 17th place in the rider's championship.

Red Bull KTM Factory Racing (2017–2018)

2017 
In March 2016, Smith was confirmed as the first-signed rider for the new KTM works entry to the championship. He was later joined by his long-time Tech3 teammate Espargaró.

The 2017 season proved difficult but positive for Smith and the new constructor, finishing third-to-last of all regular riders and well behind his teammate, but achieving sufficient points to finish ahead of Aprilia in the constructors' championship and 10th of 12 in the teams' championship.

2018 
2018 showed slight improvement for Smith as he climbed to 18th place in the championship with 38 points, though well behind teammate Espargaró, despite having fewer retirements on the season.

Aprilia Racing Team

2019 
With the high-profile signing of Johann Zarco at KTM, Smith was dropped by the factory team. He was quickly signed by Aprilia in a test rider role. Aprilia elected to enter Smith as a wildcard entry at four rounds: Qatar, Jerez, Catalunya, and Aragon. With 2 retirements, a 17th- and a 19th-place finish, he achieved 0 points in his wildcard entries.

Aprilia Racing Team Gresini

2020 
Smith came back as a replacement full-time rider, after Andrea Iannone's suspension due to a doping controversy. He was replaced by Lorenzo Savadori for the last three rounds.

MotoE World Cup

One Energy Racing (2019)
For 2019, alongside his Aprilia test and wildcard rider duties, Smith was permitted to sign with One Energy Racing for the inaugural season of the MotoE World Cup. Of the six race season, Smith achieved four podiums and clinched second place in the standings with 88 points.

World SSP Championship

Ten Kate Racing Yamaha (2022)
At 2022, Bradley Smith will make his World Superbike debut in Argentina round with the Ten Kate World Supersport team.

Career statistics

Grand Prix motorcycle racing

By season

By class

Races by year
(key) (Races in bold indicate pole position; races in italics indicate fastest lap)

Suzuka 8 Hours results

Supersport World Championship

Races by year
(key) (Races in bold indicate pole position; races in italics indicate fastest lap)

References

External links

 

1990 births
Living people
Sportspeople from Oxford
British motorcycle racers
English motorcycle racers
125cc World Championship riders
Moto2 World Championship riders
KTM Factory Racing MotoGP riders
Tech3 MotoGP riders
Gresini Racing MotoGP riders
MotoGP World Championship riders
MotoE World Cup riders